The Gilles are the primary group of participants in the Carnival of Binche.

Gilles may also refer to:
Gilles (given name), a French language masculine given name
 Gilles (novel), a 1939 novel by Pierre Drieu La Rochelle
 Gilles, Eure-et-Loir, a town in France
 Gilles, French variant form of Giles (surname)
 Gilles (stock character), French stock character of farce and commedia dell'arte
 Gilles (2005 film), a Belgian drama film directed by Jan Verheyen and Pieter Van Hees
 Gilles (2008 film), a Canadian short drama film directed by Constant Mentzas

See also
 Giles (disambiguation)